The Washington University Medical Center (WUMC), located in St. Louis, Missouri, is a large scale health-care focused commercial development located in St. Louis' Central West End neighborhood. The Washington University Medical Center Redevelopment Corporation focuses on developing public-private partnerships that promote infrastructure and housing development in the WUMC area. As of 2017, the executive director of WUMCRC is Brian Phillips.  Although many of the institutions are affiliated with Washington University in St. Louis, most of the institutions of WUMC are independent of the university. Notably, the medical center is anchored by Barnes-Jewish Hospital and also houses the Washington University Medical School.

History 
The Washington University Medical Center was incorporated in 1962. It is located on over  directly to the east of Forest Park. WUMC serves as the anchor of the Central West End community, a commercial and residential neighborhood with numerous shops, restaurants, and night spots.

WUMC is accessible from the Kingshighway at I-64/US 40 or the Central West End station of the St. Louis Metrolink. Regular transportation is provided by rail and bus between WUMC and the other campuses of Washington University.

Institutions 
The institutions of the Washington University Medical center are frequently ranked among the most prestigious and renowned hospitals in the United States. The major institutions in the Washington University Medical Center include:
 Alvin J. Siteman Cancer Center
 Barnes-Jewish Hospital
 Center for Advanced Medicine
 Central Institute for the Deaf
 Goldfarb School of Nursing at Barnes-Jewish College
 St. Louis Children's Hospital
 St. Louis College of Pharmacy
 Washington University School of Medicine
Other institutions located at the campus are:

 Shriners Hospital for Children- St Louis

References

External links
Alvin J. Siteman Cancer Center
Center for Advanced Medicine
Goldfarb School of Nursing

Washington University in St. Louis
Hospitals in St. Louis
Economy of St. Louis
Central West End, St. Louis
1962 establishments in Missouri